Star is a hub within the Disney+ streaming service for television and film content intended for a general audience. The hub is available in a subset of countries where Disney+ operates. Programs released exclusively on Star are branded as Star Originals. During The Walt Disney Company Investor Day 2020, it was announced that content from Disney-owned networks such as Hulu, ABC and FX, along with other Disney-owned programming would premiere exclusively on Star internationally as well. It was also announced that Star would produce original local content which will be exclusively released on the platform.

Original programming

Star Originals

Comedy

Non-English language

French

Italian

Japanese

Korean

Mandarin

Spanish

Turkish

Other

Co-productions

Continuations

Exclusive international distribution

Drama

Comedy

Animation

Adult animation

Anime

Kids & family

Non-English language

Indonesian

Japanese

Korean

Portuguese

Spanish

Other

Unscripted

Docuseries

Reality

Variety

Original films

Star Originals

Feature films

Shorts

Exclusive international distribution

Feature films

Documentaries

Specials

Upcoming original programming

Star Originals

Drama

Comedy

Non-English language

German

Italian

Japanese

Korean

Spanish

Turkish

Other

Co-production

Exclusive international distribution

Drama

Comedy

Animation

Anime

Non-English language

Continuations

Upcoming original films

Regional original films

Exclusive international distribution

See also
List of Hulu original programming (original films)
List of Disney+ original programming (original films)
List of Disney+ Hotstar original programming (original films)

Notes

References

Disney+
Internet-related lists
Lists of television series by network
Lists of television series by streaming service
Television lists